This is a list of all the cricketers who played first-class cricket for Taranaki cricket team. Taranaki played a total of eight first-class matches between 1883 and 1898.

B
 Alfred Bayly, 1891/98
 Frank Bayly, 1882/83
 George Bayly, 1882/98
 Harry Bayly, 1891/92
 Charles Beresford, 1882/83

C
 Thomas Campbell, 1894/95
 Ernest Cole 1896/97
 Henry Coutts, 1882/92
 William Crawshaw 1896/98
 John Cunningham, 1882/83

D
 William D'Arcy, 1891/92

E
 Harry Elliott, 1891/98

F
 Michael Foley, 1882/83
 Louis Fowler 1897/98
 John Fulton, 1882/83

G
 Matthew Goodson, 1891/92
 George Grindrod 1896/97
 George Gudgeon 1897/98

H
 Herbert Haggett, 1894/98
 George Harden, 1894/95
 George Heenan, 1891/98

I
 Ernest Izard 1896/98

L
 Edmund Lash 1897/98
 Roger Lucena, 1891/92
 Robert Lusk, 1891/95

M
 Walter Marcroft, 1894/95
 Joy Marshall, 1891/92
 John Mathieson, 1882/83
 Bernard McCarthy, 1894/98
 William Mills, 1894/95
 Francis Moore, 1894/98
 Henry Moore, 1894/95

P
 Henry Parrington, 1882/83
 Percy Pratt, 1894/98

R
 James Read, 1882/83
 Frederick Riddiford, 1882/92
 Frederick Robertson 1897/98

S
 William Salmon, 1891/92
 Ernest Shove, 1891/92
 George Syme, 1891/98

T
 Arthur Tonks, 1891/92
 William Tucker, 1891/92

References

Taranaki cricketers